Daryl Neilsonn Ong (born March 24, 1987) is a Filipino singer and songwriter. He rose to fame after joining the singing competition The Voice of the Philippines.

When Ong sang his blind audition piece "Paano" (original by Gary Valenciano) for The Voice of the Philippines Season 2, he impressed the judges and the Filipino viewers.

Life and career 
Before he push through his singing career, he was a cartoonist in ABS-CBN. Ong was an animator of the popular Filipino animated series, "Super Inggo at ang Super Tropa". The animated series was the first 100% Pinoy Filipino animated TV series.

From being a member of a boy group named "Voices of 5", he started doing a plenty of song covers, such as "All of Me", "Kahit Maputi Na Ang Buhok Ko", "Rude" “ Ikaw Na Nga" which gives new flavour to the listeners and posted it on his own YouTube channel which gained hundreds and thousands of views.

In 2005 and 2008, he was a strong contender in the local singing contests, Pinoy Pop Superstar (2005) and Pinoy Idol (2008). While in 2014, he decided to join ABS-CBN's reality singing competition, The Voice of the Philippines (season 2). In his blind audition, he impressed the coaches as he was one of those ‘3-chair’ turners. Among the three coaches, he chose the international artist, record producer and Black Eyed Peas member, apl.de.ap.

From 2016 – February 2018, Daryl Ong was under Cornerstone Entertainment Inc, however he was no longer under Cornerstone after a contract renewal with Star Music. He is a member of the all-male vocal trio BuDaKhel along with Bugoy Drilon and Michael Pangilinan, and currently managed by KreativDen.

Discography

Singles 
2015 – Stay (On the Wings of Love)
2016 – Ikaw (FPJ's Ang Probinsyano)
2016 – Basta't Kasama Kita (FPJ's Ang Probinsyano)
2016 – To Love Again (Till I Met You)
2017 – How Did You Know (Ikaw Lang ang Iibigin)
2018 – Sana Dalawa ang Puso Ko (Sana Dalawa ang Puso)

Filmography 

Daryl Ong also did guestings in various ABS-CBN, GMA and TV5 shows:
 Umagang Kay Ganda
 Magandang Buhay
 It's Showtime
 Masked Singer Pilipinas (as 2-2-B [Winner])
 Sunday Noontime Live!
 Gandang Gabi, Vice!
 Tonight with Boy Abunda
 Eat Bulaga
 Wowowin

Accolades

References 

1987 births
Living people
21st-century Filipino male singers
Filipino male models
Filipino people of Chinese descent
ABS-CBN personalities
Star Music artists
The Voice of the Philippines contestants
Masked Singer winners
People from Puerto Princesa